Bobrinsky or Bobrinski, feminine: Bobrinskaya is a surname associated with the Russian noble family of Bobrinsky. Notable people with the surname include:

Aleksei Aleksandrovich Bobrinsky (1852-1927), Russian historian and statesman
 (1762–1813), founder of the Bobrinsky family
Georgiy Bobrinsky  (1863 – 1928), Russian military and statesman
Nadezhda Aleksandrovna Bobrinskaya (1865-1920), Russian astronomer and humanitarian volunteer
Nikolay Alekseyevich Bobrinski  (1890–1964), Russian zoologist and biogeographer
Sofia Dolgorukova née Countess Bobrinsky (1887–1949), Russian surgeon, pilot and racing driver

See also